The  is one of nine active divisions of the Japan Ground Self-Defense Force. The division is subordinated to the Central Army and is headquartered in Nagoya, Aichi. Its responsibility is the defense of the Aichi, Fukui, Gifu, Ishikawa, Mie and Toyama prefectures.

The division was raised on 18 January 1962.

Organization 

 10th Division, in Nagoya
 10th Division HQ, in Nagoya
 14th Infantry Regiment, in Kanazawa, with 1x headquarters, 4x infantry, and 1x 120mm mortar company
 33rd Infantry Regiment, in Tsu, with 1x headquarters, 4x infantry, and 1x 120mm mortar company
 35th Infantry Regiment, in Nagoya, with 1x headquarters, 4x infantry, and 1x 120mm mortar company
 10th Reconnaissance Battalion1, in Kasugai, with Type 87 armored reconnaissance vehicles
 10th Tank Battalion1, with Type 74 main battle tanks
 10th Artillery Regiment2, in Toyokawa
 1st Artillery Battalion, with 2x batteries of FH-70 155mm towed howitzers
 2nd Artillery Battalion, with 2x batteries of FH-70 155mm towed howitzers
 3rd Artillery Battalion, with 2x batteries of FH-70 155mm towed howitzers
 10th Anti-Aircraft Artillery Battalion, in Toyokawa, with Type 81 and Type 93 Surface-to-air missile systems
 10th Combat Engineer Battalion, in Kasugai
 10th Signal Battalion, in Nagoya
 10th Aviation Squadron, in Ise, flying UH-1J and OH-6D helicopters
 10th NBC Protection Company, in Nagoya
 10th Logistic Support Regiment, in Kasugai
 1st Maintenance Battalion
 2nd Maintenance Battalion
 Supply Company
 Medical Company
 Transport Company
note 1: Scheduled to be merged into the new 10th Reconnaissance Combat Battalion with Type 16 maneuver combat vehicles in 2023.note 2: Scheduled to deactivated at a date to be determined.

External links
 Homepage 10th Division (Japanese)

Japan Ground Self-Defense Force Division
Military units and formations established in 1962